Andriy Oleksiyovych Smalko (born 12 January 1981) is a Ukrainian retired football player.

Career
In 1997, he started his career for Borysfen Boryspil, where he stayed for five seasons, and he won the Ukrainian Second League in the season 1999–2000.

International
He was called in Ukraine U19, in Ukraine U20 and in Ukraine U21. With Ukraine U20, he participated at the 2001 FIFA World Youth Championship tournament in Argentina, where he got into the Knockout stage against Paraguay.

Honours
Avanhard Bziv
 Ukrainian Amateur Cup: 2018–19
 Kyiv Oblast Championship: 2017, 20182019, 2019

Borysfen Boryspil
 Ukrainian Second League: 1999–2000

Arsenal Kyiv
 Ukrainian Second League: 2015–16

Gallery

See also
 2001 FIFA World Youth Championship squads#Ukraine

References

External links 
 
 
Profile on website 

1981 births
Living people
People from Chornobyl
Soviet footballers
FC Desna Chernihiv players
FC Zirka Kropyvnytskyi players
FC Borysfen Boryspil players
FC Chornomorets Odesa players
SC Tavriya Simferopol players
FC Kharkiv players
FC Stal Alchevsk players
FC Oleksandriya players
FC Arsenal Kyiv players
FC Zorya Luhansk players
FC Avanhard Bziv players
Ukrainian Premier League players
Ukrainian First League players
Ukrainian Second League players
Ukrainian Amateur Football Championship players
Ukraine youth international footballers
Ukraine under-21 international footballers
Association football defenders
Sportspeople from Kyiv Oblast